Antipodoecia is a monotypic genus of caddisflies belonging to the monotypic family Antipodoeciidae. The only species is Antipodoecia turneri.

The species is found in Australia.

References

Trichoptera
Trichoptera genera
Monotypic insect genera